The 1964 United States Senate election in Hawaii took place on November 3, 1964.

Incumbent Republican U.S Senator Hiram Fong was re-elected to a second term in office, defeating Democratic U.S. Representative Thomas Gill.

Republican primary

Candidates
Hiram Fong, incumbent Senator
Frank Troy, Democratic candidate for Senate in 1962

Results

Democratic primary

Candidates
Thomas Gill, U.S. Representative
Joseph Petrowski
Nadao Yoshinaga, State Senator from Maui

Results

General election

Results

See also 
 1964 United States Senate elections

References 

Hawaii
1964
1964 Hawaii elections